Deserie Baynes (née Huddleston 11 September 1960  Mildura, Victoria, Australia  ) is an Australian  sport shooter. She won the Bronze medal in the Double trap in the  1996 Atlanta Summer Olympics.

References

1960 births
Australian female sport shooters
ISSF rifle shooters
Shooters at the 1996 Summer Olympics
Shooters at the 2000 Summer Olympics
Olympic shooters of Australia
Olympic bronze medalists for Australia
Olympic medalists in shooting
Living people
Medalists at the 1996 Summer Olympics
Commonwealth Games medallists in shooting
Commonwealth Games gold medallists for Australia
Shooters at the 2006 Commonwealth Games
20th-century Australian women
21st-century Australian women
Medallists at the 2006 Commonwealth Games